Methanococcus maripaludis is a species of methanogen. It is anaerobic, weakly motile, non-spore-forming, Gram-negative, and a pleomorphic coccoid-rod averaging 1.2 by 1.6 μm is size. Its genome has been sequenced.

References

Further reading

External links
LPSN

Type strain of Methanococcus maripaludis at BacDive -  the Bacterial Diversity Metadatabase

Euryarchaeota
Archaea described in 1984